Gajendragad (also called Gajendragada)  is a town and a sub-district place in Gadag District, Karnataka, India. This place is known for its hill station and hill strip. Highest populated city after Gadag in the district. It is about 55 kilometers from the district head quarter Gadag,  110 kilometers from Hubballi, 200 kilometers from Belagavi and 450 kilometers from state capital Bengaluru.

Introduction

Gajendragad (Gajendra:Elephant;gad:fort), is a historical place in the Gadag district. The name Gajendragad is a combination of Elephant and a fort. This is because the city looks like elephant body in the bird view. Local people generally call it as Gada. It is about 55 km from Gadag and is one of the big towns in the Gadag District. Gajendragad is a pilgrimage destination due to its Kalakaleshwara temple.

It is known for the long hill strip, hill station, film shooting spots, fort, kalakaleshwara temple, market for Javali / Dress Materials for marriage and festivals, windmills, Handloom, Gajendragad Kubusa Kana.

History

Gajendragad is surrounded by the historical places associated with Badami Chalukyas and Western Chalukya and the places are Badami, Aihole, Pattadakal, Mahakuta, Banashankari, Sudi, Mahadeva Temple at Itagi and Kudalasangama. Rastrakuta Monuments at Kuknur. The Gajendragad fort and town were built and renewed by Chhatrapati Shivaji Maharaj.

Ghorpade

Founder of the Ghorpade family was Shri Valabhasinh Cholaraj Ghorpade
and then the descended Bahirjirao (Hindurao) Ghorpade

The Royal families of Kapsi and Gajendragad owe their origin to Vallabhasinha and the Chiefs of Sondur are descended from the third son of Cholraj.

Treaty of Gajendragad

After the 2nd Mysore War, Tippu Sultan had to engage in an armed conflict (during 1786–87) with the Marathas and the Nizam. The war concluded
with the treaty of Gajendragad. Tipu Sultan ceded Badami to the Marathas.

Tipu would release Kalopant and return Adoni, Kittur, and Nargund to their previous rulers. Badami would be ceded to the Marathas. Tipu would also pay an annual tribute of 12 lakhs per year to the Marathas. In return, Tipu would get all the places that they had captured in the war, including Gajendragarh and Dharwar. Tipu would also be addressed by the Marathas by an honorary title of "Nabob Tipu Sultan, Fateh Ali Khan".
In Fourth Anglo-Mysore War maratha empire presented its support to the East India Company.

Tourism

Kalakaleshwara temple
The pilgrim Kalakaleshwara temple, is a huge mountain with the temple carved into it. This is a weekend destination which could be wound up in a day's time. One can see many windmills lined on the hill opposite the hill on which the temple is located.

Sudi
Mallikarjuna Temple, Twin Towered Temple, Ishwara in a stone made shelter and Naga Kunda are prime attractions of Sudi.

Itagi Bhimambika
The temple of Bhimambika, about 13 km from Gajendragad

Banashankari
It is known for temple of Banashankari, and Annual car festival.

Badami, Aihole, Pattadakal and Mahakuta
 Badami
 Aihole
 Pattadakal
 Mahakuta

Mahakuta is the source of an important Badami Chalukya inscription called Mahakuta Pillar inscription.

Kuknur
MahaMaya temple, Navalinga Temples at Kuknur.

Kudalasangama
At Kudalasangama the rivers Krishna and Malaprabha merge (sangama) here, This place is closely associated with the 12th-century poet and social reformer Basavanna. There is a temple dedicated to Lord Sangameswara, worshipped in the form of a linga. The temple is an ancient monument built in the Chalukya style architecture. This place is well developed as one of the great tourism place.

Kalakaleshwara temple

A little known pilgrim of North Karnataka. Gajendragad is a small town lying amidst hills, in one of which is encapsulated Kalakaleshwara temple of Lord Shiva (known as Dakshina Kashi), who is worshipped in the form of Kalakaleshwara. There are some large steps that lead you up to the temple. It is a traditional temple with Udbhava Linga. There we can find God Veerabhadra temple also in the same premises. But one would definitely be amazed at the story in which the significance of the destination lies. Just outside the temple exit is a small square water reservoir called AntharaGange. It is an evergreen water resource that constantly falls along the roots of Peepal tree into the pond all throughout the year. It is said to be flowing even in the peaks of summer season and has an unknown root.

Mythology

More amazing is the story attached to this destination that has taken a few lives too. These were the daring people who wanted to try to learn more about a miracle that happens on the previous night of Ugadi, New Year of Kannadigas. The pandit/pujari of the temple prepares a solution of limestone, and keeps it ready for application along with a brush, inside the temple. The next morning, the jobs done. But the temple is painted on its own and this happens without fail every year. A hookah that is also kept along with it seems to be used when seen the next morning.

MMTC's wind farm

Minerals & Metals Trading Corporation (MMTC) Limited under the ministry of commerce and industry.  MMTC's Gajendragad plant started in 2007, the plant has delivered electricity power of over 102 million units to Hubli Electricity Supply Company (HESCOM) Limited. The plant generate a total capacity of 15 MW of power, with 25 wind energy generators, can each generate 600 KV.

Environmental issues 

Windmills set up to generate wind energy, are posing a threat to the very existence of rare hyenas and wolves at Gajendragad. Earlier Gajendragad was recognised as a safe haven for highly endangered species like the Indian grey wolf and striped hyenas, but wind farming and windmills with huge noisy fans and human traffic to maintain these machines have driven away these species from their habitat.

Notable people 
Raghavendra Acharya - scholar in Vedanta, Vyakarana (Grammar), Nyaya (Law), Mimamsa and Alankar,  lived in Gajendragad
 Prahlad Balacharya Gajendragadkar - served as the Chief Justice of India from 1964 to 1966, was native to Gajendragada.

Geography
It has an average elevation of 643 metres (2109 feet).

Demographics
 India census, Gajendragarh had a population of 28,227. Males constitute 51% of the population and females 49%. Gajendragarh has an average literacy rate of 62%, higher than the national average of 59.5%: male literacy is 74%, and female literacy is 51%. In Gajendragarh, 14% of the population is under 6 years of age.

See also

 Ghorpade
 Sandur (princely state)
 Mudhol State
 Gooty
 North Karnataka
 Tourism in North Karnataka
 Badami, Pattadakal, Aihole, Mahakuta
 Kuknur
 Mahadeva Temple (Itagi)
 Sudi
 Gadag District
 Mudhol Hound

Gallery

References

Forts in Karnataka
Shiva temples in Karnataka
Cities and towns in Gadag district
Cliff dwellings
Hindu temples in Gadag district